Glen Rose (April 23, 1905 – September 3, 1994) was an American football and basketball coach. He served as the head basketball coach at the University of Arkansas from 1933 to 1942 and again from 1952 to 1966, as well as the head football coach for two seasons during World War II (1944–1945). Rose was also the head basketball coach at Stephen F. Austin College from 1948 to 1952.

Rose was born on April 23, 1905, Siloam Springs, Arkansas. He grew up in Little Rock, Arkansas. Rose died on September 3, 1994, at Fayetteville City Hospital in Fayetteville, Arkansas, following several months of declining health.

Basketball
Rose played basketball for the Arkansas Razorbacks and was selected All-Southwest Conference from 1926 to 1928, and as an All-American in 1928. After his playing days ended, he served as assistant coach from 1929 to 1932.

In 1932, Rose became head coach at Arkansas and led the team from 1933 to 1942, winning five Southwest Conference titles. He coached at Stephen F. Austin College for four seasons from 1948 to 1952, before returning to Arkansas for 14 more seasons from 1952 to 1966.

Rose compiled a record of 325–201 at Arkansas and 56–35 at Stephen F. Austin.

Football
Rose was the head football coach at Arkansas from 1944 to 1945. During his tenure, he compiled an 8–12–1 (.405) record.

Head coaching record

Football

Basketball

See also
 List of NCAA Division I men's basketball tournament Final Four appearances by coach

References

External links
 

1905 births
1994 deaths
American men's basketball players
Arkansas Razorbacks athletic directors
Arkansas Razorbacks baseball players
Arkansas Razorbacks football coaches
Arkansas Razorbacks football players
Arkansas Razorbacks men's basketball coaches
Arkansas Razorbacks men's basketball players
Camp Grant Warriors football coaches
Stephen F. Austin Lumberjacks basketball coaches
All-American college men's basketball players
People from Siloam Springs, Arkansas
Sportspeople from Little Rock, Arkansas
Coaches of American football from Arkansas
Players of American football from Arkansas
Baseball players from Arkansas
Basketball coaches from Arkansas
Basketball players from Arkansas